Guilherme Gomes Garutti (born 8 March 1994), also known as Garutti, is a Brazilian professional footballer who plays as a defender for Romanian Liga I side CS Mioveni. In his career, Garutti also played for various lower league clubs from Brazil, such as Guarani, Barretos, Montijo, Oeste or Anapolina.

References

External links
 

1994 births
Living people
Brazilian people of Italian descent
People from Marília
Brazilian footballers
Association football defenders
Campeonato Brasileiro Série B players
Campeonato Brasileiro Série C players
Marília Atlético Clube players
Clube Atlético Linense players
Guarani FC players
Barretos Esporte Clube players
Clube Olímpico do Montijo players
Oeste Futebol Clube players
Associação Atlética Anapolina players
Associação Desportiva São Caetano players
Associação Portuguesa de Desportos players
Associação Atlética Aparecidense players
Sertãozinho Futebol Clube players
Liga I players
Liga II players
CS Mioveni players
Brazilian expatriate footballers
Expatriate footballers in Portugal
Brazilian expatriate sportspeople in Portugal
Expatriate footballers in Romania
Brazilian expatriate sportspeople in Romania
Footballers from São Paulo (state)